is a multimedia management company in Japan dealing in recordings, films, television, music publishing and artist management as well as the main subsidiary of the Watanabe Production Group.

Formed by bandleader Shin Watanabe and his wife Misa Watanabe in 1955, the company has become one of the most influential of its kind in Japan. It is referred to informally in Japanese as Nabe-pro (ナベプロ, nabepuro).

Talent clients
Yukiko Iwai, former member of Onyanko Club
Sonoko Kawai, former member of Onyanko Club
Alan Merrill, recording artist with Watanabe Productions 1969-71
Kenji Sawada, former member of The Tigers
Koji Seto, member of D-Boys
The Peanuts
Led Zeppelin, 1972 Japan tour organizer
The Candies
Queen. Publishing and Licensing Rights - Japan
David Bowie. Publishing and Licensing Rights - Japan
Deep Purple. Publishing and Licensing Rights - Japan
Golden Half

Group subsidiaries
Watanabe Entertainment Co., Ltd.
Watanabe Music Publishing Co., Ltd.
Watanabe Kikaku Co., Ltd.
Izawa Office Co., Ltd.
Iwappara Ski Resort
The Works Co., Ltd.
Sound City Co., Ltd.
Watanabe Enterprise Co., Ltd.
Mates Co., Ltd.
Mania Mania Inc.
Top Coat Co., Ltd.
Watanabe Music Culture Forum Foundation

External links
 Watanabe Production Group

Mass media companies of Japan
Japanese talent agencies
Mass media companies